William Cohen (born 1940) is an American author and politician who served as Secretary of Defense (1997–2001) under Bill Clinton.

William Cohen may also refer to:
William W. Cohen (1874–1940), U.S. Representative from New York
William Edgar Cohen (1941–2014), filmmaker
William D. Cohen, associate justice of the Vermont Supreme Court

See also
William D. Cohan (born 1960), newspaper reporter
Bill Coen, basketball coach
Billy Coen, fictional Resident Evil character